is a passenger railway station located in the city of Kaizuka, Osaka Prefecture, Japan, operated by the private railway operator Mizuma Railway.

Lines

Layout
The station consists of one island platform connected to the street by a level crossing.The station is unattended.

Platforms

Adjacent stations

History
Nagose Station opened on December 24, 1925.

Passenger statistics
In fiscal 2019, the station was used by an average of 423 passengers daily.

Surrounding area
 Osaka Prefectural Road No. 40 Kishiwada Ushitakiyama Kaizuka Line
 Sengokubori Castle ruins

See also
 List of railway stations in Japan

Reference

External links

 Schedule 

Railway stations in Japan opened in 1925
Railway stations in Osaka Prefecture
Kaizuka, Osaka